Egnew is a surname. Notable people with the surname include:

 Danielle Egnew (born 1969), American musician and actress
 Michael Egnew (born 1989), American football player

See also
 Agnew (surname)